Events in the year 1880 in Norway.

Incumbents
Monarch: Oscar II

Events

Arts and literature

Births

January to June
2 February – Arnt Ferdinand Moss, accountant and politician.
20 March – Oscar Ludvig Larsen, politician
13 April – Alfred Vågnes, politician (died 1970)
29 April – Anders Krogvig, librarian, writer, literary consultant and critic (died 1924)
29 April –  Jonas Lie, artist (died 1940 in America)
18 May – Thomas Thorstensen, gymnast and Olympic gold medallist (died 1953)
16 June – Joachim Holst-Jensen, film actor (died 1963)

July to December
2 July – Olav Bergersen, naval officer and politician (d. 1973).
1 August – Hans Nordvik, rifle shooter and Olympic gold medallist (died 1960)
30 August – Nikolai Astrup, painter (died 1928)
28 September – Jon Jørundson Mannsåker, priest and politician (died 1964)
7 October – Johan Undrum, politician (d. 1940).
8 December – Per Lysne, Rosemaling artist (died 1947)
30 December – Svend Evensen, judge.

Full date unknown
Nils Christoffer Bøckman, military officer and businessperson (died 1973)
Haakon Martin Five, politician and Minister (died 1944)
Knut Gunnarsson Helland, Hardanger fiddle maker (died 1920)
Jens Holmboe, botanist (died 1943)

Deaths

15 February – Carl Roosen, cartographer and military officer (born 1800)
9 July – Jens Landmark, military officer and politician (born 1811)
17 August – Ole Bull, violinist (born 1810
8 October – Magnus Brostrup Landstad, minister, psalmist and poet (born 1802)

Full date unknown
Knut Eriksson Helland, Hardanger fiddle maker (born 1851)

See also

References